The 1933 season was the fourth completed season of Finnish Football League Championship, known as the Mestaruussarja.

Overview

The 1933 Mestaruussarja  was contested by 8 teams, with HIFK Helsinki winning the championship which was also known as the A-sarja. VPS Vaasa and EIF Tammisaari were relegated to the second tier which was known as the B-sarja.

League table

Results

References

Mestaruussarja seasons
Fin
Fin
1933 in Finnish football